The solitary tract (tractus solitarius, or fasciculus solitarius), is a compact fiber bundle that extends longitudinally through the posterolateral region of the medulla oblongata.  The solitary tract is surrounded by the solitary nucleus, and descends to the upper cervical segments of the spinal cord. It was first named by Theodor Meynert in 1872.

Composition
The solitary tract is made up of primary sensory fibers and descending fibers of the vagus, glossopharyngeal, and facial nerves.

Function
The solitary tract conveys afferent information from stretch receptors and chemoreceptors in the walls of the cardiovascular, respiratory, and intestinal tracts.   Afferent fibers from cranial nerves 7, 9 and 10 convey taste (SVA) in its rostral portion, and general visceral sense (general visceral afferent fibers, GVA) in its caudal part. Taste buds in the mucosa of the tongue can also generate impulses in the rostral regions of the solitary tract.  The efferent fibers are distributed to the solitary tract nucleus.

Synonyms
There are numerous synonyms for the solitary tract: 
round fasciculus (Latin: fasciculus rotundus)
solitary fasciculus (Latin: fasciculus solitarius)
solitary bundle (Latin: funiculus solitarius)
Gierke respiratory bundle (Named for German anatomist Hans Paul Bernhard Gierke).
Krause respiratory bundle (Named for German anatomist Johann Friedrich Wilhelm Krause).

References
 

Medulla oblongata
Neurophysiology
Vagus nerve
Glossopharyngeal nerve
Facial nerve
Gustatory system
Human homeostasis
Innervation of the tongue